Ernst Weber may refer to:

 Ernst Heinrich Weber (1795–1878), German physician; founder of experimental psychology
 Ernst Weber (engineer) (1901–1996), Austrian-American electrical engineer
 Ernst Weber (footballer) (1902–1991), Swiss footballer and chairman